Esper Lass is a supervillainess appearing in media published by DC Comics. She first appeared in Superboy Starring the Legion of Super-Heroes #212 (October 1975).

Fictional character biography
Meta Ulnoor is from Titan, the moon of Saturn, in the 30th century. Like other natives of Titan (including Legionnaire Saturn Girl), she is a natural telepath. After being rejected for membership in the Legion of Super-Heroes (due to a rule prohibiting members with duplicate powers), she joins a group of fellow rejects and demands membership. Calling themselves the "Legion of Super-Rejects", they are initially victorious over their like-powered rivals. Esper Lass and the Super-Rejects are eventually defeated when the Legionnaires use teamwork to win.

Esper Lass is later seen as a member of the Legion of Super-Villains. Her last pre-Zero Hour appearance was a cameo during Crisis on Infinite Earths.

She was later seen in Final Crisis: Legion of 3 Worlds #2, once again a member of the Legion of Super-Villains. She's later seen attacking Saturn Girl's mind, along with Saturn Queen. In the next issue, she's been mentally blocked by the Saturn Girl of Earth-Prime, to stop her from aiding Saturn Queen.

Powers and abilities
Like other natives of Titan, Esper Lass was born with a number of psychic powers. She can read minds, and exert some mental control over others. In her initial appearance, she proves to have stronger powers than Saturn Girl, and is able to overpower the more experienced superhero.

In other media
Esper Lass appears in Legion of Super-Heroes voiced by Tara Strong. She first appears as a member of Lightning Lord's Light Speed Vanguard. She returned with the team in and knocks Saturn Girl into a coma with the help of Tharok. Lightning Lad became obsessed with getting revenge on her personally, but was talked down by Phantom Girl.

References

External links 
Esper Lass at the Unofficial Guide to the DC Universe

DC Comics characters who have mental powers
DC Comics female supervillains 
DC Comics telepaths 
DC Comics aliens 
Fictional telepaths
Comics characters introduced in 1975